Oregon's 2nd congressional district is the largest of Oregon's six districts, and is the seventh largest district in the nation. It is the second-largest congressional district in the nation that does not cover an entire state,  and has been represented by Republican Cliff Bentz of Ontario since 2021. 

The district covers roughly two-thirds of the state, east of the Willamette Valley. It includes all of Baker, Crook, Deschutes, Gilliam, Grant, Harney, Hood River, Jackson, Jefferson, Klamath, Lake, Malheur, Morrow, Sherman, Umatilla, Union, Wallowa, Wasco, Wheeler counties, and part of eastern Josephine county, including some of the Grants Pass area.

With a Cook PVI of R+15, it is the only Republican-leaning district in the state, and has been in Republican hands since 1981.

Recent presidential elections

List of members representing the district

Election results 
Sources (official results only): 
Elections History from the Oregon Secretary of State website
Election Statistics from the website of the  Clerk of the United States House of Representatives

1996

1998

2000

2002

2004

2006

2008

2010

2012

2014

2016

2018

2020

2022

Major communities 
Due to its large geographical area, the 2nd District contains many different communities which operate completely independently from one another socially and economically.  Below is a list of the largest statistical areas in the 2nd District tracked by the United States Census Bureau.

Historical district boundaries

Prior to the 2000 United States Census, most of Josephine County was part of the district. After the 2010 United States Census, the district boundaries were changed slightly to move some parts of Grants Pass from the 2nd to the 4th district.

See also

Oregon's congressional districts
List of United States congressional districts

References
Specific

General

 Congressional Biographical Directory of the United States 1774–present

02
Baker County, Oregon
Crook County, Oregon
Deschutes County, Oregon
Gilliam County, Oregon
Grant County, Oregon
Harney County, Oregon
Hood River County, Oregon
Jackson County, Oregon
Jefferson County, Oregon
Josephine County, Oregon
Klamath County, Oregon
Lake County, Oregon
Malheur County, Oregon
Morrow County, Oregon
Sherman County, Oregon
Umatilla County, Oregon
Union County, Oregon
Wallowa County, Oregon
Wasco County, Oregon
Wheeler County, Oregon
1893 establishments in Oregon
Constituencies established in 1893